Titao is a town located in the province of Loroum in Burkina Faso. It is the capital of Loroum Province. Since 2019 it has been under siege by Islamic rebels.

References 

Populated places in the Nord Region (Burkina Faso)
Loroum Province